Heikki Johannes Silvennoinen (born 27 April 1954) is a Finnish musician and an actor.  He was a guitarist and a songwriter in several notable Finnish bands in the 1970s and 1980s, and has also recorded solo albums.   He is best known in Finland as a member of comedy group Kummeli, which started a television show in 1991.

Silvennoinen owns a production company named Pirkka-Hämeen Apina & Gorilla Oy ("Ape and gorilla of Pirkka-Häme Inc.").  With his fellow comedian Timo Kahilainen he owns Porkkana Ryhmä Oy ("Carrot Group Inc."), which produces Kummeli's output.

Life and career

Tabula Rasa
Silvennoinen was born in Kiviapaja, Sääminki. As a young boy he admired the music of Eric Clapton, Cream and Jimi Hendrix.  He learned to play the guitar and formed a rock band called Tabula Rasa, one of the most important 1970s progressive rock bands in Finland.  When the group released their debut album, Silvennoinen started to realize that music was likely to be his primary occupation.  His later career has not been associated with progressive rock, but during the Tabula Rasa years he composed almost all the songs that the group recorded.  After Tabula Rasa came to an end, Silvennoinen joined Juice Leskinen's band.

1980s
In the 1980s, Silvennoinen became a professional producer and collaborated with many significant bands.  He played guitar in bands called Frendz and Catwalk, and in 1987 he formed a group called Q.Stone with singer Mikko Kuustonen.  This band was English singing blues-rock group that released four relatively well-received albums.  Kuustonen decided to leave the group and concentrate on his solo career. Silvennoinen continued to play the guitar on his albums.

Solo albums
In the beginning of the 1990s Silvennoinen released his first solo album, Mature And Cool. It included his own songs and a cover of Blind Willie Reynolds song "Outside Woman Blues" (popularized by Cream).   His second solo album, Bobcat, was released in 1997.  It includes Silvennoinen's own song "Sun Don't You Shine" and a cover of "Fire" by Jimi Hendrix.  On the sleeve notes of the album he thanks his idols, not just Hendrix and Clapton, but also Peter Green and Stevie Ray Vaughan (he has personally met Vaughan and Clapton).  His next album, Sweet Surrender, was released two years later.  In 2000 Silvennoinen founded his own label and released the album Blues Blue Sky, which contains mostly old blues songs.  The album Miehet kaatuu was released in 2003, and is his only album containing lyrics in Finnish.

Kummeli
In the beginning of the 1990s Silvennoinen became more popular in Finland due to the television show Kummeli.  Of the four member group, Silvennoinen had the largest number of different roles (including reporter Mauno Ahonen, summer cottage neighbour Martti Mielikäinen, Matti Näsä who complains about everything, and officer Jaakko Parantainen who is concerned about environmental questions).  The show and group had phenomenal success in Finland in 1994, when they also made their first stage appearances and toured all of Finland.  After that Kummeli has continued its existence in various forms.  Silvennoinen has stated that their best gag was the one about Lada summit, since it gave an inspiration for the real Lada summit event that still takes place yearly in Finland.  The most lucrative song – from the point of view of royalties – Silvennoinen ever wrote was "Jumankauta juu nääs päivää" that he claims to have done in 20 minutes.  It features the Kummeli character Matti Näsä singing about his car, a Toyota Mark II. Despite of the popularity of Kummeli, Silvennoinen also worked as a janitor in the late 1990s.

2000s
In 2002 Silvennoinen formed the group SF-Blues with well-known Finnish musicians Pepe Ahlqvist (harp, vocal) and Dave Lindholm (guitar, vocal), with all members sharing songwriting duties on their first album.  In the following year, singer Erja Lyytinen replaced Lindholm for next album.  In 2005 guitarist Jukka Tolonen and singer Mikko Kuustonen joined the group in order to make their second album, Joutomailla.  Other musicians that have been involved with the band include singer Eero Raittinen and keyboardist Jukka Gustavson.  In the 2000s Silvennoinen did voice acting work for some children movie characters needing Finnish overdubs.

Discography

Solo albums 
 Mature And Cool (1992)
 Bobcat (1997)
 Sweet Surrender (1999)
 Blues Blue Sky (2000)
 Miehet kaatuu (2003)

Tabula Rasa
 Tabula Rasa (1975)
 Ekkedien Tanssi (1976)

Q.Stone
 Q. stone (1988)
 Pink on blue (1990)
 Q. stone III (1992)
 No substitute (1993)

Kummeli
 Artisti maksaa (1994)
 Kummeli Stories Soundtrack (1995)

SF-Blues
 SF-Blues (2002)
 Joutomailla (2005)
 Man – Be Careful! (2007)

Filmography
As writer, actor or voice actor:
 Kummeli Stories (1995) – screenwriter, actor
 Kummeli Kultakuume (1997) – actor
 Johtaja Uuno Turhapuro – pisnismies (1998) – actor
 Kummelin Jackpot (2006) – actor
 Autot (2006) – voice actor
 Karvakamut  (2006) – voice actor
 Kummeli Alivuokralainen (2008) – actor
Ralliraita (2009) - actor

Television programs
 Q-Klubi (1991–1992) – actor
 Kummeli (1991–) – writer, producer, actor
 Lihaksia ja luoteja (1996) – writer, producer, actor
 Aatami & Beetami (1997) – actor
 Lääkärit tulessa (1998) – actor
 Herra Heinämäen Lato-orkesteri (1999) – narrator
 Mankeli (2000–2001) – writer, producer, actor
 Jurismia! (2002) – actor
 Beatlehem (TV-movie, 2003) – actor
 Nyrölä 3 (2004) – actor
 Hopeanuolet (2007) – actor

References

External links
 home page
 Heikki Silvennoinen on MySpace
https://www.imdb.com/name/nm0798628/?ref_=fn_al_nm_1

1954 births
Living people
People from Savonlinna
Blues guitarists
Finnish male actors
Finnish male guitarists
Finnish record producers
20th-century Finnish male singers
Finnish blues musicians
21st-century Finnish male singers